Michael James Scott (born May 24, 1981) is an American actor and singer, known for his work on the Broadway stage. He is best known for playing the Genie in Disney's Aladdin musical in the Original Australian Cast, as well as in the West End, U.S. National Tour, and Broadway productions.

Early life
Scott was born in Baltimore, Maryland, the son of Michael and Karen Scott. He attended Rock Springs Elementary school in Apopka, Florida, then Robinswood and Gotha Middle School.  In high school, he attended the Dr. Phillips High School Visual and Performing Arts Program.

Michael worked as a child actor doing commercials, TV shows, and musicals; he also sang in concerts around the Central Florida area.

He trained with Ann Reinking's Broadway Theatre Project for four years, two as an assistant.

Career
As a young adult Michael got a string of TV work, theatre shows and singing engagements, before getting his BFA degree at The Conservatory of Theatre Arts program at Webster University in St. Louis, Missouri.  While in college, he was the standby for Ben Vereen on the international tour of Fosse from 2003 to 2004.  He joined the first National U.S. tour of Mamma Mia! from 2004 to 2005. In 2005, he made his Broadway debut in 2005 in the musical All Shook Up. He appeared off-Broadway opposite Donna McKechnie in Here's to the Public. In 2006, after a short stint in Disney's Tarzan on Broadway, he reprised his Mamma Mia! role of Eddie in the Broadway production. In 2007, he was in the original Broadway company for Boublil and Schönberg's new musical The Pirate Queen.  In 2008, he was a part of the concert cast of Jerry Springer: The Opera at Carnegie Hall and shortly afterwards went on to originate Barry Belson (actor)in the Las Vegas production of Jersey Boys.  He returned to Broadway in 2009 in a revival of Hair, continuing on to the West End production the following year, for which he was also associate choreographer.  At the end of that year, he returned to Broadway in the original cast of Elf, until it closed in 2011. He then played Dr. Gostwana in the original Broadway company of The Book of Mormon.  During his time in Book of Mormon, he took a short break to play Donkey in Shrek the Musical at the MUNY of St. Louis before finally leaving Mormon in 2013.  He joined the original Broadway company of Disney's Aladdin musical as the Genie standby. In 2015, he left to originate the Minstrel in Something Rotten! on Broadway.

He originated the role of Genie in the Australian production of Disney's musical Aladdin, which opened in Sydney in August 2016, before leaving the company in December 2017 to join the U.S. national tour of Aladdin. He received a Helpmann Award in 2017 for Best Performance by a Featured Actor in a Musical for his work in the Australian Production.

Scott is a member of the group The Broadway Boys and Grammy-nominated Broadway Inspirational Voices.  He continues to sing at concerts, special events and benefits around the country.

Theatre credits
Ragtime, North Carolina Theatre
Cinderella, The Muny
South Pacific, The Muny
Fosse, standby for Ben Vereen, Tour, 2001–02
Mamma Mia!, Eddie, Tour, 2003–04
All Shook Up, Ensemble, Broadway, 2005
Here's to the Public!, off-Broadway, 2005
Tarzan, Swing, Broadway, 2006
Aida, Mereb, The Muny, 2006
Mamma Mia!, Eddie (replacement), Broadway, 2006–07
The Pirate Queen, Ensemble, Broadway, 2007
Jersey Boys, Ensemble/Barry Belson (u/s), Las Vegas, 2008
Jerry Springer: The Opera, Carnegie Hall, 2008
Hair, Swing/Margaret Mead (u/s)/Hud (u/s), Broadway, 2009
Hair, associate choreographer/Hud (u/s)/Tribe Member, West End, 2010
Elf, Ensemble/Macy's Manager (u/s), Broadway, 2010–11
The Book of Mormon, Dr. Gostwana, Broadway, 2011–12
Here's to Joe, off-Broadway, 2013
Shrek The Musical, Donkey, regional, 2013
Aladdin, Genie standby/Babkak standby, Broadway, 2014–15
Something Rotten!, Minstrel, Broadway, 2015-16
Aladdin, Genie, Australian Tour, 2016–2017
Aladdin, Genie, North American Tour, Jan-Aug 2018, Jan-Feb 2020
Aladdin, Genie, West End, Aug 2018-Feb 2019
Aladdin, Genie, Broadway, Feb-Sept 2019, Feb 2020–Present

Filmography
South Park, special thanks, 1 episode, 2011
The Carrie Diaries, Hot Gay Guy #1, 1 episode, 2013
The Broadway.com Show, himself, 1 episode, 2013
Submissions Only, William Fox, 1 episode, 2014
The Tonight Show Starring Jimmy Fallon, Minstrel, 1 episode, 2015
For Real, Michael, TV movie, post-production, 2016 (also producer)
Black Monday Chad, 1 episode, 2019

Personal life 
Scott is gay; he married filmmaker Jeremy Merrifield after dating for ten years and knowing each other for about twenty. They have a French Bulldog named Chloé Phylicia.

References

1981 births
21st-century American male actors
African-American male actors
20th-century African-American male singers
American male musical theatre actors
American gay actors
American gay musicians
Helpmann Award winners
American LGBT singers
Living people
20th-century American LGBT people
21st-century American LGBT people
21st-century African-American people